Ingle International is a Canadian insurance group of companies based in Toronto, with other offices around the world. Ingle International provides travel health insurance products to various types travellers, including international students, snowbirds, expatriates, and high risk travellers.

History
Ingle International was established in 1946 under the name John Ingle Insurance by John and Muriel Ingle, as a health insurance provider for newcomers and immigrants to Canada. The company first began to offer student insurance in 1950. International student insurance was introduced in 1960, with the first travel insurance for snowbirds introduced in 1988.

John Ingle Insurance was rebranded as Ingle International several years after Robin Ingle, son of John and Muriel, took over the company in 1985. In 1991, the Ontario provincial government ended its US health coverage for Canadian travellers. As a result, Ingle International developed the first formal Snowbird Insurance plan for the province of Ontario, by the direct request of the Ontario Health Insurance Plan (OHIP).

In 1998, Ingle International, known as Ingle Health at the time, was sold to the investment arm of a Canadian financial institution.

In 2002, after a private settlement between Robin Ingle and the institution that purchased the company, Ingle Health resumed operations in Canada as Ingle, now functioning as a managing general insurance underwriter and managing general insurance agent.

In 2006, the Ingle Group of Companies was created, which included Ingle International, and the newly founded Novus Health. In 2008, Peak Contact, a technology development company was founded and joined the group. In 2011, Intrepid 24/7 was launched and added to the Ingle Group of Companies as an emergency travel and medical assistance service. In 2013, sisu production was founded and joined the Ingle Group as a media and digital production company.

In 2013, Ingle International expanded internationally and the company introduced new implementations to existing products, such as third-party liability and homestay liability insurance for international students and homestay families.

Business
Ingle International’s primary product is travel insurance, including medical and non-medical coverage to international and domestic travelers. It operates internationally and has offices in Canada, the United States, Chile, Mexico, Malta, and Brazil, and the business is headquartered in Toronto, Ontario, Canada. The current CEO and chairman is Robin Ingle.

Ingle International offers custom services with its group of companies, including Novus Health, Peak Contact, Intrepid 24/7, and sisu production.

Awards
 2013 – International Travel Insurance Journal's Assistance/Claims Handler Finalist
 2014 – Insurance-Canada Technology Award Winner

References

Financial services companies established in 1946
Companies based in Toronto
Health insurance companies of Canada
Privately held companies of Canada